The École Mondiale World School is an accredited International Baccalaureate (IB) school in Mumbai in the primary, middle years and diploma courses. It also offers the International General Certificate of Secondary Education (IGCSE) at year 10 levels through Cambridge International Examinations, the International Division of the University of Cambridge Local Examinations Syndicate.

The school opened in 2004 and is one of five IB World Schools in Mumbai and 18 in India.

School 

 Administration;
Principal – Ms. Tina Santilli
Head of Secondary – Ms. Helen Dowse
Head of Primary – Ms. Shilpa Dholakia

 List of Events
Ecole Energize
Early Years Sports
Unheard Voices
TEDxEMWS
EMUN
Compete To Defeat
Sanskardham
Sols' Arc

 Battlelaureate

Battlelaureate is an annual event held by Ecole Mondiale world school. It consists of a multitude of competitions and events, with celebrities coming in to either attend or judge these competitions.

Controversy
In 2011, a parent from École Mondiale World School in Juhu has alleged that her children were expelled by the school as she was late by 18 days in paying their annual fees. Also, she had to pay an extra 10 lac for re-admitting her children.

References

External links 
 

International Baccalaureate schools in India
Cambridge schools in India
International schools in Mumbai
Educational institutions established in 2004
2004 establishments in Maharashtra